A treasure is a concentration of riches.

Treasure may also refer to:

Literature
 Treasure (Cussler novel), a 1988 novel by Clive Cussler
 Treasure (magazine), a British periodical for children
 Treasure: In Search of the Golden Horse, a 1984 puzzle/contest book by Dr. Crypton (Paul Hoffman)
 The Treasure (New Testament apocrypha) or Cave of Treasures, a book of the New Testament apocrypha
 The Treasure (novel), a 1904 novel by Selma Lagerlöf
 The Treasure (play) or The Gold Diggers, a play by Sholem Aleichem

Music

Albums 
 Treasure (Cocteau Twins album), 1984
 Treasure (Hayley Westenra album), 2007
 Treasure (Holly Cole album), 1998
 A Treasure, a 2011 album by Neil Young
 Treasure, an album by Charnett Moffett, 2010
 Treasures (Dolly Parton album), 1996
 Treasures (Iona album), or the title song
 Treasures (Night Ark album), 2000
 Treasures (Tatsuro Yamashita album), 1995

Songs 
 "Treasure" (song), a 2013 song by Bruno Mars
 "Treasure", by 38 Special from Bone Against Steel
 "Treasure", by the Brothers Johnson from Light Up the Night 
 "Treasure", by Chapterhouse from Whirlpool
 "Treasure", by Choppersaurus, a project by Jake Shillingford of My Life Story
 "Treasure", by Flyleaf from Memento Mori
 "Treasure", by Iona from Treasures
 "Treasure", by Meredith Andrews from The Invitation
 "Treasures", by Thievery Corporation from The Mirror Conspiracy

Bands 
 Treasure (band), a South Korean boy band

Television and film
 Treasure (1958 TV series), an American program
 Treasure (animated TV series), a British/Canadian cartoon programme
 Treasure HD (Canada), now HIFI, a Canadian English-language Category B specialty channel
 Treasure HD, an American digital cable specialty channel, part of the defunct Voom HD Networks
 Treasures.tv, a UK channel
 "The Treasure" (Dynasty), an episode of Dynasty
 The Treasure (1923 film), a 1923 German film directed by G. W. Pabst
 The Treasure (2015 film), a 2015 Romanian film directed by Corneliu Porumboiu
 The Treasure (2017 film), a 2017 Hong Kong-Chinese film directed by Gordon Chan and Ronald Cheng

Other uses
 Treasure (surname)
 Treasure (company), a Japanese video game developer
 Treasure, codename of Nathalie Sergueiew (1912–1950), female double agent who worked for MI5 during World War II
 , several ships by the name
 Treasure (tanker), a ship that spilled oil near Cape Town, South Africa, in 2000
 Treasure trove, in law, any discovered accumulation of valuables that can be presumed unowned or unclaimed
 Treasures Ministries, a Christian support group for women in the sex industry, founded by Harmony Dust

See also
 Treasure Beach, a beach in Jamaica
 Treasure Coast, a region of Florida, U.S.
 Treasure County, Montana, U.S.
 
 
 Treasurer
 Treasury
 Tresor, underground techno nightclub and record label
 Trésor, a 2010 album by Kenza Farah
 TRESOR (TRESOR Runs Encryption Securely Outside RAM), a Linux kernel patch